Vagabonderne på Bakkegården is a 1958 Danish comedy film directed by Alice O'Fredericks and Robert Saaskin.

Cast
 Poul Reichhardt - Martin
 Ib Mossin - Anders
 Astrid Villaume - Anna
 Ghita Nørby - Hanne
 Preben Lerdorff Rye - Jonas
 Helga Frier - Martha
 Christian Arhoff - Klinke-Hans
 Jakob Nielsen - Fodermester Volle
 Karl Stegger - Bonde
 Per Lauesgaard - Karl
 Einar Juhl - Doktor Jansen
 Ole Monty - Købmand Rasmussen
 Kirsten Passer - Inga
 Holger Hansen - Holger Fællessanger
 Irene Hansen - Servitrice
 Judy Gringer - Ung pige
 Bodil Sangill - Ung pige
 Anna Henriques-Nielsen - Frk. Jensen
 Thorkil Lauritzen - Bankbestyrer

External links

1958 films
1950s Danish-language films
1958 comedy films
Films directed by Alice O'Fredericks
Films scored by Sven Gyldmark
Danish comedy films